Myasnikyan is a town in the Armavir Province of Armenia. The town is named for Aleksandr Myasnikyan, the Armenian Bolshevik revolutionary and statesman who led Soviet Armenia at the beginning of Lenin's New Economic Policy (NEP). It is the location of Araks railway station. Population is 4507 people. The town is populated by Armenians and Kurds (including Yazidis).

References 

World Gazetteer: Armenia – World-Gazetteer.com

Populated places in Armavir Province
Kurdish settlements in Armenia
Yazidi populated places in Armenia